Scott Baker (born 1947 in Chicago) is an American science fiction, fantasy, and horror writer.

His first novel, l'Idiot-roi (Symbiote's Crown), won the French Prix Apollo Award in 1978. In addition, he won the World Fantasy Award in 1984 for his short story Still Life with Scorpion.

Bibliography

Novels
Symbiote's Crown (1978) [Prix Apollo Winner]  
Nightchild (1979) 
Dhampire (1982) 
Drink the Fire from the Flames (1987) (Ashlu) 
Firedance (1986) (Ashlu) 
Webs (1989) 
Ancestral Hungers (1996)

Short story collections (in French only)
Nouvelle recette pour canard au sang (1983)
Fringales (1985)
Aléas (1985)

Short stories (in English)
Flatsquid Thrills (1982)
The Path (1982)
The Lurking Duck (1983)          (World Fantasy nominee)
Still Life with Scorpion (1984)  (World Fantasy winner)
Sea Change (1986)                (Locus Awards nominee)
Nesting Instinct (1987)          (World Fantasy nominee)
The Sins of the Fathers (1988)
Varicose Worms (1989)            (World Fantasy nominee, Locus Awards nominee)
Alimentary Tract (1990)
The Jamesburg Incubus (1990)
Virus Dreams (1993)
Prospero (1993)
Full Fathom Deep (1995)
Feral Frolics (2014)

Anthologies (in French only)
Ombres portées (1990)

References

The Encyclopedia of Science Fiction, page 82

External links

French bibliography and book covers at nooSFere
French bibliography, covers, and cover copy at librarie YS: littératures de l'imaginaire

1947 births
20th-century American novelists
20th-century American male writers
American fantasy writers
American horror writers
American male novelists
American science fiction writers
Living people
World Fantasy Award-winning writers
American male short story writers
20th-century American short story writers
People from Pacific Grove, California
Novelists from California